A media consultant is a marketing agent or public relations executive that is hired by businesses or political candidates to obtain positive press coverage.  Media consultants usually draft press releases to highlight positive achievements of a business, organization, or individual, and prepare subjects for interviews with the media. In politics, media consultants create advertisement campaigns to plant a desired image in the minds of voters.

Alternatively, a media consultant is also a person or company that enables media organizations to develop their businesses. An example where a consultant would be needed is a company that is moving its print business online.

Consulting firms such as Bain, McKinsey & Company, and Boston Consulting Group have media, technology, and entertainment practices. Media consultants at management consulting firms seek to address issues facing the industry such as strengthening operational efficiency, brand strategy, digital media strategies, and business technology. Media consultants are often employed by businesses to help them manage their media agency relationships and audit their advertising spend.

Social media

Many consultants have entered the area of social media. A social media consultant's work involves advising clients on developing online media campaigns. These campaigns typically include the use of video, blogs, forums and other features commonly seen on social networking sites.

These consultants also assist companies with managing their online presence on blogs and popular social networking sites such as Facebook, Myspace, Google+ and Twitter. Increasingly, the more engaged companies are in social media the more valued their brands are.

Digital marketing 
Search Engine Optimization (SEO) is the active practice of improving aspects of your website so that commercial search engines (such as Google, Bing, and Yahoo) can find and display your Web pages in the results when they’re relevant to a searcher’s query as stated by Digital.gov part of the U.S. General Services Administration. Marketing related decisions are no longer guided just by hypothesis and past experience. Influential marketing ideas are now determined by analytics and big data. By utilizing past data and predictive analytics, businesses can now generate better return on investment and provide insights that can lead to effective business strategies and decisions within an organization as stated by Forbes.

References

Mass media occupations
Consulting occupations